Salisbury District Council was the local authority for the non-metropolitan district of Salisbury, created in 1974 in Wiltshire, England. It was abolished on 1 April 2009 and replaced by Wiltshire Council.

Political control
From the first election to the council in 1973 until its abolition in 2009, political control of the council was held by the following parties:

Leadership

The role of mayor was largely ceremonial at Salisbury District Council. Political leadership was instead provided by the leader of the council. The leaders from 2003 until the council's abolition in 2009 were:

Council elections
1973 Salisbury District Council election
1976 Salisbury District Council election (New ward boundaries)
1979 Salisbury District Council election
1983 Salisbury District Council election
1987 Salisbury District Council election
1991 Salisbury District Council election (District boundary changes took place but the number of seats remained the same)
1995 Salisbury District Council election (District boundary changes took place but the number of seats remained the same)
1999 Salisbury District Council election
2003 Salisbury District Council election (New ward boundaries)
2007 Salisbury District Council election

District result maps

By-election results

References

External links

 
Politics of Salisbury
Council elections in Wiltshire
District council elections in England